The 24th Golden Eagle Awards were held August 31, 2008, in Changsha, Hunan province.
Nominees and winners are listed below, winners are in bold.

Television Series

Best Television Series
Chuang Guan Dong/闯关东
Golden Marriage/金婚
Soldiers Sortie/士兵突击
A Dream of Youth/恰同学少年
Gobi Mother/戈壁母亲
Zhou Enlai in Chongqing/周恩来在重庆
The Story of Xi Gengtian/喜耕田的故事
Stand by Me/奋斗
Broken the Jade/玉碎
Jinggang Mountain/井冈山
Xun Huisheng/荀慧生

Best Mini-series
The House of 72 Tenants/七十二家房客Li Qingzhao/李清照
Sword/砺剑
Life of True Emotion/真情人生

Best Directing for a Television SeriesKang Honglei for Soldiers Sortie

Best Writing for a Television Series
Gao Mantang for Chuang Guan Dong

Best Actor in a Television Series
Li Youbin for Chuang Guan Dong
Wang Boqiang for Soldiers Sortie
Lin Yongjian for The Story of Xi Gengtian
Wang Wufu for Jinggang Mountain

Best Actress in a Television Series
Jiang Wenli for Golden Marriage
Liu Jia for Gebi Mother
Tong Lei for Song of the Youth
Sa Rina for Chuang Guan Dong

Best Art Direction for a Television Series
Zhao Hai for Ming Dynasty 1895

Best Cinematography for a Television Series
Wang Bin for Chuang Guan Dong

Best Lighting for a Television Series
Dai Jun for Chuang Guan Dong

Favorite Actor
Wang Boqiang for Soldiers Sortie

Favorite Actress
Jiang Wenli for Golden Marriage

Literature & Art Program

Best Literature and Art Program
2008 CCTV New Year's Gala/2008年中央电视台春节联欢晚会2008 Beijing TV New Year's Gala/2008北京新春大联欢
The 6th Golden Eagle Awards Ceremony/第六届中国电视金鹰艺术节颁奖晚会
2007 Vienna New Year's Concert /2007年维也纳新年音乐会
2007 Dancing with Stars/2007舞林盛典
繁花似锦－第十届精神文明建设"五个一工程"颁奖晚会
感动2006——中国十大真情故事评选颁奖晚
鱼跃龙腾——鱼龙百戏2008新春盛宴

Best Directing for a Literature & Art Program
 Directing group for 2008 CCTV New Year's Gala

Best Cinematography for a Literature & Art Program
 Cinematography group for 2008 CCTV New Year's Gala

Best Art Direction for a Literature & Art Program
 Jiangshan for The 6th Golden Eagle Awards Ceremony

Documentary

Best Television Documentary
The Nanjing Massacre/见证南京大屠杀Yuanmingyuan Park/圆明园
Saving Prisoners/囚犯生死大转移
Six Hundred Years of Kunqu/昆曲六百年
Song of Forest/森林之歌
Drinking in the Same River/同饮一江水
Finding the First Bird/寻找第一只鸟
Tax/解读皇粮国税
The Story of Zhou Enlai/周恩来的故事
Artist Daolang/刀郎乐人

Best Writing and Directing for a Television DocumentaryWriting & directing group for Ten Years of Hong Kong

Best Cinematography for a Television Documentary
Cinematography group for Ten Years of Hong Kong

Children & Teens

Best Animation
Olympic Journal of Fuwa/福娃奥运漫游记
Little Carp's Adventure/小鲤鱼历险记
Old and Young Fool/老呆和小呆
Chinese Boy/中华小子
Happy Father & Son/哈皮父子
One Foot Paradise/独脚乐园

Best Children and Teens Program
2007 Shanghai International Children & Teens Art Festival Opening Gala/2007上海国际少年儿童文化艺术节开幕式晚会
Clothes of Love/爱的彩衣
Space Journey/太空旅行团

References

External links
Winners List of 24th Golden Eagle Awards

2008
2008 in Chinese television
Events in Changsha
Mass media in Changsha